Robert Ellin (1837–1904) was an English-born American stone and wood sculptor.

Ellin was born December 21, 1837, in Yorkshire, England. He was active in the United States 1867 to 1904.  Not much is known about his life until his association with a fellow Englishman and Yorkshireman John William Kitson. Together they entered a mahogany breakfront in the 1876 Bi-Centential juried event in which they won a prize and much acclaim.

Robert Ellin established his firm as Robert Ellin & Co circa 1870 in NYC. He and John William Kitson joined forces in 1874 before the 1876 Bi-Centennial as Robert Ellin and Company.  In 1879 they formally changed the firm's name to Ellin & Kitson. Following the early death of William Kitson in February 1888, the name of the firm was changed to Ellin, Kitson and Company. The Estate of John William Kitson became a silent partner until the estate sale of the business in 1904.

Ellin is mentioned in ''A History of the Metropolitan Museum of Art" 1913 by Howe and Kent.

Robert Ellin was an astute businessman and promoter of his firm.  In order to control costs he became involved in many mining and other supplies businesses. In 1872 Robert Ellin was elected a director of the Bay of Fundy Red Granite Company located in St. George, New Brunswick, Canada; Perth Amboy Terra Cotta Works; 1893 The Goodsell Marble Company Newark NJ.  He was active in establishing the Metropolitan Museum of Art and was an officer of the Sculpture Society covering stone.

In July 1874 he filed for a trade mark name of Terra-Cotta in the Great Britain Patent Office
In 1899 Ellin filed for a U S patent of a design for crushing or grinding mill, which was awarded to him in May 1900 Patent # 650, 798.  
He is also noted to have carved the cherry frieze in Old South Church in Boston, Massachusetts between 1872 and 1875.  Much of the finest work done by Ellin & Kitson has been in the magnificent group of private residences which have been the nucleus of our American art life ...sculpturing formalizing their partnership with emphasis in churches. They have been noted as specialty contractors in many buildings from NYC to Boston. Please see Ellin & Kitson for a list of some of the buildings with which they are associated.

In 1900 census he is noted to be living in Westchester, New York.  He died February 3, 1904, in Yonkers, NY.  At the time of his death, Ellin, Kitson & Co were working on Senator Clark of Montana's NYC home.

Ellin & Kitson worked with many notable architects and designers of the day: Thomas Wisedell, J C Cady, Robert J Withers, Vaux/ Withers, George B. Post, Kimball & Wisedell, Frederick Law Olmsted, and Richard Hunt among them.

External links
"History of Granite Industry in St. George, NB" Charlotte County Historical Society No 46", Miss M. Eulalia O"Halloran, page 8
New York Times Oct 3, 1884 "Remarkable Building Work: Where the Stone of the Mutual Life Building Came From"
The Commissioners of Patents Journal England September 15, 1874
New York NY Tribune May 4, 1902 Page 2, American Art Industries Wood Carving
Stone; an Illustrated Magazine - Google Books Result 1894 Vol 9 Page 470
Stone; an Illustrated Magazine - Google Books Result 1902 Vol 24-Editorial "The Founder of American Architectural Decoration" pages 342-345
Real Estate Record and Builders' Guide August 10, 1901 Mortgages and Assignments Borough of Manhattan
George Titus Ferris "Gems of the Centennial Exhibition" 1877 D. Appleton & Co, NYC Pages 136-139
The Critic: An Illustrated Monthly Review of Literature, Art 1893 Vol 22-23 Pages 391-2
Building Trades Employers Association Vol 5 1904 page 56
Mining and Scientific Press, Volumes 77-78 1898–99, May 20, 1899, Page 611
Great Britain Patent Office "The Commissioner of Patents Journal" August 11, 1874 Page 2466
Official Gazette of the United States Patent Office, May 29, 1900, Pages 776-7

1837 births
1904 deaths
American sculptors
American woodcarvers
English emigrants to the United States
Artists from Yorkshire